Samangan (also Romanized as Samangān; also known as Samangī) is a village in Dasht-e Laleh Rural District, Asir District, Mohr County, Fars Province, Iran. At the 2006 census, its population was 169, in 35 families.

References 

Populated places in Mohr County